Madacom is a telecommunications and Internet service provider in Madagascar.  It is owned by Celtel, an African multinational telecommunications company.

External links
Madacom - French language

Telecommunications companies of Madagascar
Antananarivo